Egidio Ortona (16 September 1910 – 10 January 1996) was an Italian diplomat whose career spanned the years 1931 to 1975. He was the Permanent Representative of Italy to the United Nations (1958–1961) and Ambassador to the United States (1967–1975).

Life
Egidio Ortona was born in Casale Monferrato on 16 September 1910. He graduated in law at the University of Turin in 1931 and the following year entered the Italian diplomatic service. He worked first in Cairo and then in Johannesburg, where he married.

In 1937 he was posted to the Italian embassy in London, where he worked for the ambassadors Dino Grandi and Giuseppe Bastianini.  From 1940 to 1943 Ortona worked in the latter’s offices in Zadar, where Bastianini was appointed governor, and in Rome where Bastianini was undersecretary for foreign affairs under Benito Mussolini. Ortona’s diaries from this period, which he published as Diplomazia di guerra. Diari 1937-1943, cover these years when he was able to observe at close hand the collapse of Italy’s diplomatic relations with London, its subsequent entry into World War II as an ally of Nazi Germany, and the fall of Mussolini in 1943.

In November 1944 he was appointed to a delegation seeking economic assistance from the United States for the post-war reconstruction of Italy. He remained in Washington at the Italian Embassy until, in 1958, he was appointed as Italy’s Ambassador to the United Nations, remaining in the job for a little over two years, during which period Italy was a non-permanent member of the Security Council.

Ortona returned to Italy in 1961 becoming Director General of Economic Affairs at the Ministry of Foreign Affairs and then Secretary General of the Ministry itself. In this period he played an instrumental role in the successful signing of the Ussr-Fiat deal that marked the beginning of private mass motorization in the leading socialist State.

In 1967 Ortona was appointed Italian ambassador in Washington, a post which he held for the next eight years.

In 1975 Ortona, aged 65, retired from the diplomatic service. He took on posts as president of Honeywell’s Italian businesses, of Aeritalia and of Confitarma (Confederazione italiana armatori). (In a departing meeting with US President Gerald Ford he expressed reluctance to depart the civil service, insisting "I hate to be a businessman".) He also became president of the Istituto per gli Studi di Politica Internazionale (Institute for International Policy Studies) and published several volumes of his diaries which together cover the years 1937–1975.

Egidio Ortona died in Rome on 10 January 1996 at the age of 85. He was buried in Casale Monferrato where, on 16 March 2007, the public gardens of the Piazza Martiri della Libertà near the house where he was born were officially dedicated to him.

Works 
Diplomazia di guerra – Diari 1937-1943, Bologna: Il Mulino, 1993.
Anni d’America - La ricostruzione 1944-1951, Bologna: Il Mulino, 1984.
Anni d’America – La diplomazia 1953-1961, Bologna: Il Mulino, 1986.
Gli anni della Farnesina. Pagine del diario 1961-1967, Milan: Spai, 1998.Anni d’America – La cooperazione 1967-1975'', Bologna: Il Mulino, 1989.

Honors 
 Order of Merit of the Italian Republic 1st Class / Knight Grand Cross – August 9, 1967

See also 
 Ministry of Foreign Affairs (Italy)
 Foreign relations of Italy

Notes

External links
UN Audiovisual - Egidio Ortona at the UN Audiovisual Library
Photos of Egidio Ortona in Immaginario Diplomatico - collection of historical photos of Italian Diplomats by Stefano Baldi

References
 .
.

1910 births
1996 deaths
People from Casale Monferrato
Permanent Representatives of Italy to the United Nations
Ambassadors of Italy to the United States
Italian diplomats
20th-century diplomats
Knights Grand Cross of the Order of Merit of the Italian Republic